John Henry Crockett (January 5, 1864 – January 19, 1925) was an American Democratic politician who served as a member of the Virginia House of Delegates and Virginia Senate from 1914 until his death in 1925. The rest of his term was completed by his son, Samuel.

References

External links

1864 births
1925 deaths
Democratic Party Virginia state senators